{{DISPLAYTITLE:C8H15NO6}}
The molecular formula C8H15NO6 (molar mass: 221.21 g/mol, exact mass: 221.089937) may refer to:

 N-Acetylgalactosamine
 N-Acetylglucosamine
 N-Acetylmannosamine

Molecular formulas